Robert Joyce may refer to: 

Rob Joyce, American government official
Robert Dwyer Joyce (1830–1883), Irish poet and writer
Robert Francis Joyce (1896–1990), American prelate of the Roman Catholic Church
Robert Hayman-Joyce (born 1940), British military officer

See also
Joyce Roberts, English table tennis player